KMBL 1450 AM is a radio station licensed to Junction, Texas. The station broadcasts a Classic Country format and is owned by Danny Ray Boyer, through licensee Tenn-Vol Corp.

References

External links

Classic country radio stations in the United States
MBL